Live from... was a Sunday night live entertainment variety television show that aired on ITV from 16 January 1983 to 27 November 1988 and was hosted by Jimmy Tarbuck. It was broadcast live from a theatre in London and followed in the tradition of earlier variety spectacles such as Sunday Night at the Palladium.

Death of Tommy Cooper
During the second series of Live from Her Majesty's on 15 April 1984, comedian Tommy Cooper collapsed and died after suffering a massive heart attack. Cooper collapsed against the curtain, and most members of the audience were laughing, assuming that it was a joke Cooper was playing. It was not until compere Jimmy Tarbuck realised that the drop was not part of Cooper's routine, that the production crew suddenly realised what had occurred.

The show continued after an earlier than planned commercial break and after Tarbuck was reportedly informed Cooper was recovering. Backstage, while the show continued with Howard Keel's performance, paramedics frantically attempted to revive Cooper, but he was pronounced dead on arrival at Westminster Hospital. His death was not officially reported until the next morning, although the incident led the ITN News bulletin which followed the show.

Transmissions

References

1983 British television series debuts
1988 British television series endings
English-language television shows
ITV (TV network) original programming
London Weekend Television shows
Television series by ITV Studios
British variety television shows